Tynset Idrettsforening is a Norwegian sports club from Tynset, Hedmark. It has sections for association football, team handball, cycling, judo, orienteering, speed skating, skiing, swimming, and taekwondo.

It was established on 15 September 1900 as Tønset IF, and the name was modernized to Tynset IF in 1923 at the same time as the club adopted association football.

The men's football team currently plays in the 3. divisjon, the fourth tier of the Norwegian football league system. It last played in the 2. divisjon in 1999.

Skiers include Tor Halvor Bjørnstad, Therese Johaug and Annar Ryen.

References

 Official site 
 Tynset Idrettsforening results

Football clubs in Norway
Sport in Hedmark
Association football clubs established in 1900
1900 establishments in Norway